Cairo is the first graphic novel of G. Willow Wilson with art by M.K. Perker, and published by the Vertigo imprint of DC Comics.

Synopsis
The story is set in contemporary Cairo, and follows six characters as they are drawn into the intrigue surrounding a stolen hookah, a box containing East and the Under-Nile of legend.

Characters
Ashraf - A hash smuggler.
Tova - An Israeli Army special forces soldier assigned to the border for her refusal to serve in the occupied territories.
Shaheed - A Lebanese-American would-be terrorist.
Shams - A centuries-old djinn, protector of a box containing East.
Jibreel - A dissident journalist often censored by the government.
Kate - A somewhat naive American tourist and aspiring journalist.
Nar - Crime lord and magician.
Iblis - The Devil.
Ta'abatta Sharran - A spirit inhabiting the city's ruins, appears as a bearded man wrapped in two great snakes. Based on the similarly named Meccan poet.

References

External links
 Cairo on dccomics.com
 IGN: Cairo

2007 books
2007 comics debuts
2007 graphic novels
Comics set in Egypt
Action-adventure comics
Fantasy comics
Vertigo Comics graphic novels